Beaulieu-les-Fontaines is a commune in the Oise department in northern France.

History
Joan of Arc was imprisoned in the keep of Beaulieu-les-Fontaines in June 1430.

Population

See also
Communes of the Oise department

References

Communes of Oise